Asca is a genus of mites with worldwide distribution in the family Ascidae.

Species
 Asca acornis Lindquist, 1972      
 Asca annandalei Bhattacharyya & Sanyal, 2002      
 Asca anwenjui Ma, 2003      
 Asca aphidioides (Linnaeus, 1758)      
 Asca arboriensis Wood, 1966      
 Asca arcuata Karg, 1996      
 Asca australica Womersley, 1956      
 Asca bicornis (G. Canestrini & Fanzago, 1876)      
 Asca brevisetosa Wood, 1965      
 Asca brevitonsoris Karg, 1998      
 Asca chilensis Karg, 1977      
 Asca crassiseta Karg, 1994      
 Asca duosetosa Fox, 1946      
 Asca evansi Genis, Loots & Ryke, 1969      
 Asca flabellifera Tseng, 1981      
 Asca foliata Womersley, 1956      
 Asca funambulusae Bhattacharyya, Sanyal & Bhattacharya, 1998      
 Asca garmani Hurlbutt, 1963      
 Asca grostali Walter, Halliday & Lindquist, 1993      
 Asca heterospinosa Karg, 1996      
 Asca hexaspinosa Karg, 1996      
 Asca holosternalis Karg, 1994      
 Asca homodivisa Karg, 1996      
 Asca idiobasis Gu & Guo, 1997      
 Asca inflata Tseng, 1981      
 Asca kosugensis Lee, Lee & Ryu, 1997      
 Asca lacertosa Tseng, 1981      
 Asca longiperitremata Bhattacharyya, Sanyal & Bhattacharya, 1997      
 Asca longoporosa Karg, 1998      
 Asca longotonsoris Karg, 1998      
 Asca macromela Walter, Halliday & Lindquist, 1993      
 Asca macrotondentis Karg, 1998      
 Asca major Womersley, 1956      
 Asca malathina Tseng, 1981      
 Asca microcuspidis Karg, 1998      
 Asca microplumosa Tseng, 1981      
 Asca microsoma Karg, 1996      
 Asca mindi Walter, Halliday & Lindquist, 1993      
 Asca minuta Bhattacharyya, 1966      
 Asca mumatosimilis Karg, 1994      
 Asca novaezelandica Wood, 1965      
 Asca odowdi Lee, Lee & Ryu, 1997      
 Asca oligofimbria Karg, 1996      
 Asca ornatissima Genis, Loots & Ryke, 1969      
 Asca pinipilosa Karg, 1998      
 Asca plantaria Ma-Liming, 1996      
 Asca plumosa Wood, 1966      
 Asca porosa Wood, 1966      
 Asca pristis Karg, 1979      
 Asca pseudospicata Bhattacharyya, 1965      
 Asca ramosa Tseng, 1981      
 Asca sinica Bai & Gu, 1992      
 Asca submajor Ma, 2003      
 Asca tondentis Karg, 1998      
 Asca tricornicula Tseng, 1981      
 Asca tridivisa Karg, 1996      
 Asca variocuspidis Karg, 1998

References

Ascidae